Ciracas is a district (kecamatan) of East Jakarta, one of the five administrative cities of Jakarta, Indonesia. Ciracas is the southernmost district in Jakarta. The area of Cibubur Scout's camping ground complex is located partly within the Ciracas District, although the main camping ground area is located in Cipayung District. The boundaries of Ciracas District are: Cipinang River to the west, Cipinang River - Jambore Road to the south, Jagorawi Tollroad to the east, and Kelapa Dua Wetan Road to the north.

History
During the Dutch East Indies period, Ciracas was a part of Meester Cornelis. In 1976, Ciracas was incorporated into Pasar Rebo subdistrict, East Jakarta. Subsequently, in 1991 Pasar Rebo was split into two districts, Pasar Rebo itself and Ciracas as a new district.

Kelurahan (administrative villages)
The district of Ciracas is divided into 5 administrative villages (kelurahan):
 Cibubur - postal code 13720
Kelapa Dua Wetan - postal code 13730
Ciracas - postal code 13740
Susukan - postal code 13750
Rambutan - postal code 13830

List of important places
Kampung Rambutan Bus Terminal, mainly serves inter-provincial inter-city buses
Cibubur market
Graha Pemuda (part of the Cibubur scout's camping ground complex)
Sport Hall Ciracas, one of the venues planned for SEA Games 2011

Toll Road Access

References

Districts of Jakarta
East Jakarta